Stacey Bernstein, known professionally as Raylene, is an American former pornographic actress.

Early life
Bernstein was born and raised in Glendora, California. She is of Italian and Mexican descent on her mother's side. Her father is Jewish of Polish and Austrian descent.

As a child, Bernstein attended Christian schools. She was an honors student in high school and graduated at age 16, two years early. She wanted to pursue Christian studies at Azusa Pacific University and become a Christian high school teacher, but did not have enough money or time to do so.

Bernstein began acting when she was five years old. With help from her uncle, who is a producer, she appeared on Hunter and 21 Jump Street.
She made a non-speaking appearance on an episode of the late nite HBO sketch comedy series Mr. Show titled "Show Me Your Weenis" in which she played an anonymous groupie at the wild house party of a fictional hair metal rock band.

Career
Bernstein entered the adult film industry in 1996 and did her first scene with Mark Davis in Shane’s World #4. She was a contract performer for Vivid Entertainment between May 1998 and November 2001.

Bernstein retired from making pornographic films in 2001 to become a real estate agent, and later retired from striptease in 2004. 
While working in real estate, Bernstein brokered a sale to the AIM Health Care Foundation.
In response to financial hardship, she made a comeback with Raylene's Dirty Work in 2009, as documented in the 2012 film After Porn Ends.
In 2014, she announced via Twitter that she had again retired.

Personal life

Bernstein was briefly married to Brad Hirsch, brother of Vivid Entertainment co-chairman Steve Hirsch.

Awards
1999 XRCO Award – Starlet of the Year
2001 AVN Award – Best Actress (Film) – Artemesia (tied with Taylor Hayes – Jekyll and Hyde)
2008 AVN Hall of Fame
2017 XRCO Hall of Fame

References

External links

 
 
 

Year of birth missing (living people)
American female adult models
American pornographic film actresses
American people of Austrian-Jewish descent
American people of Italian descent
American actresses of Mexican descent
American people of Polish-Jewish descent
Hispanic and Latino American pornographic film actors
Living people
People from Greater Los Angeles
Pornographic film actors from California
People from Glendora, California
21st-century American women